Recoiled is an EP by Coil and Nine Inch Nails described as "a compilation of Coil's unreleased work for Nine Inch Nails" and "outtakes from the remix sessions from Fixed, Closer to God and Further Down the Spiral". It was released on February 24, 2014, via British record label Cold Spring.  It was released posthumously after the deaths of the two original Coil members, Peter Christopherson and John Balance. Danny Hyde, a former employee and engineer of Coil, later licensed the remixes to Cold Spring. The release is composed of variations of previously released remixes, which appeared on the albums Fixed, Further Down the Spiral and the "Closer to God" single.

Recoiled is based on the fan-created digital EP, "Uncoiled", initially released freely on The Pirate Bay as fully tagged MP3s and FLAC files of the remixes, including original photography and printable jewel case inserts.

The EP contains remixes of four Nine Inch Nails songs, including "Gave Up", from Broken (1992), and "Closer", "The Downward Spiral" and "Eraser", from The Downward Spiral (1994). The Cold Spring release of the album features additional mastering, and a remix of the song "Eraser" that was not on "Uncoiled".

Background
In a press release, the label stated:

In 2012, members of the Nine Inch Nails fan-site echoingthesound.org collected funds to send to Danny Hyde, who had revealed the existence of out-takes of commission work Coil had produced for various Nine Inch Nails singles and EPs. Hyde mailed a CDR to a member of the forum, and the tracks were shared on The Pirate Bay as "Nine Inch Nails - Uncoiled" and included embedded artwork for each track.

When Cold Spring released Recoiled in 2014, there were reports that the limited edition brown splatter vinyl copies suffered from a pressing defect rendering them unplayable. These issues were not reported with the standard black vinyl, nor with the follow-up picture disc edition.

Cold Spring requested permission from the creators of Uncoiled for the use of the photography from that digital release, which was created by a member of echoingthesound.org as an homage to Russell Mills' bloody, frayed rope mixed-media artwork used for Further Down the Spiral.

In January 2018, Hyde posted a 21 minute video on YouTube where he talks about how he created the remixes after being contacted by the forum members by utilizing samples from the era.

Track listing

Digital version

CD version

Vinyl version

Personnel
Coil
Peter Christopherson
John Balance

Nine Inch Nails
Trent Reznor

Other personnel
Danny Hyde
Marius Andrei Dima – photography
Abby Helasdottir – design
Gregg Janman – mastering
Hermetech Mastering – mastering

References

External links
 
 

"Recoiled" on Cold Spring Records

2014 EPs
2014 remix albums
Coil (band) EPs
Nine Inch Nails EPs
Nine Inch Nails remix albums
Remix EPs
Bootleg recordings
Cold Spring (label) EPs